Timo Saarikoski (born 17 July 1969) is a Finnish ice hockey player. He competed in the men's tournament at the 1992 Winter Olympics.

Career statistics

Regular season and playoffs

International

References

External links
 

1969 births
Living people
Olympic ice hockey players of Finland
Ice hockey players at the 1992 Winter Olympics
People from Eura
Sportspeople from Satakunta